Pelopidas is a genus of skipper butterflies. They are commonly known as branded swifts or millet skippers. Polytremis kiraizana is sometimes placed here too. The genus was described by Francis Walker in 1870.

Notable species
Pelopidas agna (Moore, 1865) - dark branded swift
Pelopidas assamensis (de Nicéville, 1882) - great swift
Pelopidas conjucta (Herrich-Schäffer, 1869) - conjoined swift
Pelopidas flava (Evans, 1926)
Pelopidas jansonis (Butler, 1878)
Pelopidas lyelli (Rothschild, 1915)
Pelopidas mathias (Fabricius, 1798) - dark small-branded swift
Pelopidas sinensis (Mabille, 1877)
Pelopidas subochracea (Moore, 1878) - large branded swift
Pelopidas thrax (Hübner, 1821) - pale small-branded swift

References

 
Hesperiidae genera